The Faroe Islands Premier League 2005 season was the 63rd season of league football in the Faroe Islands.

Because of a sponsorship deal with IT company Formula, the league was renamed Formuladeildin (Formula Division).

The season was close throughout at the top of league, with HB, B36 and Skála each vying for a place at the top of league. This continued until the end of the season and there was a close finish. HB beat KÍ 2–1 to set up a last day finale against B36. If HB won, they would become champions. If B36 won, they would become champions. If the match finished in a draw, then Skála would become champions if they beat GÍ Gøta at home. In the decisive match, HB took the lead just before half-time. But after the break HB threw away their lead 20 minutes into the second half after a defensive mistake and Allan Mørkøre equalized for B36. Meanwhile, Skála ÍF were 1–0 up against GÍ Gøta. With the scores as they were Skála would become champions. But eight minutes later in the HB v B36 match, B36 had another chance and Fróði Benjaminsen scored to make it 2–1 to B36. HB couldn't make a comeback and B36 won the match. Therefore, HB's 3-year reign as Faroese champions had ended and B36 Tórshavn won the league, HB Tórshavn finished in third place. Skála ÍF drew with GÍ Gøta and finished second, GÍ avoided relegation by a last gasp equalizer in injury-time. This meant that they would play in a Relegation and Promotion playoff over two legs against B71, who finished in second place in 1. deild. GÍ won the home leg 3–0 and also won the away leg 4–1, which meant that GÍ remained in the league.

League table

Results
The schedule consists of a total of 27 games. Each team plays three games against every opponent in no particular order. At least one of the games will be at home and one will be away. The additional home game for every match-up is randomly assigned prior to the season.

Regular home games

Additional home games

Top goalscorers
Source: faroesoccer.com

18 goals
 Christian Høgni Jacobsen (NSÍ)

16 goals
 Sorin Anghel (EB/Streymur)

13 goals
 Jónhard Frederiksberg (Skála)
 Bogi Gregersen (Skála)

11 goals
 Allan Mørkøre (B36)
 Hans á Lag (HB)

10 goals
 Sámal Joensen (GÍ)

9 goals
 Súni Olsen (GÍ)
 Hjalgrím Elttør (KÍ)
 Heðin á Lakjuni (KÍ)
 Dan Djurhuus (VB/Sumba)

8 goals
 Tór-Ingar Akselsen (HB)
 Hans Pauli Samuelsen (EB/Streymur)

References

Faroe Islands Premier League seasons
1
Faroe
Faroe